Eric Francis Cock (30 June 1902 – 24 May 1965) was an Australian rules footballer who played with Collingwood in the Victorian Football League (VFL).

Cock was a member of the Collingwood team which contested the 1922 VFL Grand Final. He retired prematurely in 1926, due to concerns over his knee.

References

External links

 
 

1902 births
People educated at Scotch College, Melbourne
Australian rules footballers from Victoria (Australia)
Collingwood Football Club players
1965 deaths